The High Commission of the United Kingdom in Wellington is the chief diplomatic mission of the United Kingdom in New Zealand. It is located on Hill Street in the Thorndon suburb.

History
Prior to 1939, the Governor-General of New Zealand was the official representative of the British government, as well as of the Crown. Since this time a High Commissioner has represented the British government.

The British High Commissioner to New Zealand is also non-resident Governor of the Pitcairn, Henderson, Ducie and Oeno Islands. The High Commission also represents the British Overseas Territories in New Zealand.

Outside Wellington, there is also a British Consulate-General in Auckland, where the senior officer is the Consul-General.

See also
New Zealand–United Kingdom relations
List of diplomatic missions in New Zealand
List of High Commissioners of the United Kingdom to New Zealand

References

Wellington
United Kingdom
Buildings and structures in Wellington City
New Zealand–United Kingdom relations